The Treaty of Jaworów was a secret treaty signed on 11 June 1675 between the Polish king John III Sobieski and France in Jaworów, Poland (today Yavoriv). In the treaty, Poland promised to aid France against Brandenburg-Prussia, in exchange for French monetary subsidies and support for Polish claims over Ducal Prussia.

The French promised to mediate between Poland and the Ottoman Empire so that Polish forces could be diverted from the southern border.

The treaty, however, did not have much effect on European politics, as the French diplomacy failed to improve the relations between the Ottomans and Poland. The 1676 Truce of Żurawno was unfavorable to Poland. France eventually concluded the Treaty of Nijmegen (1679) with Brandenburg, which cooled its relations with Poland, as Sobieski abandoned his pro-French stance; the Polish-French alliance had fallen apart by 1683 when some of the pro-French faction members were accused of plotting to depose Sobieski, and French ambassador Nicolas-Louis de l'Hospital, Bishop of Beauvais and Marquis of Vitry was forced to leave the country.

Mounting pressure from Ottoman Empire postponed plans for Sobieski's war with Brandenburg, and eventually lead to the creation of the Holy League in 1684, in which Poland and the Holy Roman Empire (which included Brandenburg-Prussia) had to ally against the Ottomans (as part of the Great Turkish War, a conflict whose Polish front was known as the Polish–Ottoman War (1683–99)).

References

Jaworow
Jaworow
1675 treaties
1675 in Europe
1675 in France
1675 in the Polish–Lithuanian Commonwealth